Tofiq Ismayilov (6 April 1939 – 25 March 2016) was an Azerbaijani film director, screenwriter and film scholar. 

Ismayilov directed over 30 films, including documentaries and starred in several films. From 2007, he lectured in the Azerbaijani State University of Culture and Art. As a scholar, Ismayilov authored the encyclopedia The Cinema History of Turkic People. His articles were published in over fifty Turkish newspapers and journals.

References

External links
 

1939 births
2016 deaths
Azerbaijani film directors
Film people from Baku
Azerbaijani male film actors
Azerbaijani screenwriters
Recipients of the Order of Merit of the Republic of Turkey